The 1981 Gambian coup d'état attempt began on 30 July 1981 and was quashed in early August following a Senegalese military intervention. The insurrection was carried out by members of the Gambia Socialist Revolutionary Party and disaffected staff of the Gambia Field Force. At the time, President Dawda Jawara was in the United Kingdom attending the wedding of Prince Charles and Lady Diana Spencer. The failure of the coup precipitated the creation of the Senegambia Confederation in 1982.

Origins

Dissatisfaction in the Field Force 
The British colonial government had disbanded the Gambia Regiment due to cost concerns in 1958 and created a paramilitary unit of 140 police called the Gambia Field Force. By 1981, the Force was officially made up of 358 police, but may have actually numbered as many as 500. On 27 October 1980, Deputy Commander E. J. Mahoney was murdered by Private Mustapha Danso, at the Bakau Depot. The government explained the incident as a solitary act of mutiny, but still invoked the 1965 common defence agreement with Senegal, leading to the deployment of 150 troops on a joint training exercise called 'Operation Foday Kabba I' for one week. Furthermore, that between one-third and one-half of the Field Force would subsequently participate in the attempted coup, including the recently retired assistant commissioner Ousman Bojang, suggested that dissatisfaction within the Force was widespread.

Opposition 
The Gambian government was concerned about the foreign policy of Libyan leader Muammar Gaddafi in the region. The Libyan embassy in Banjul had been increasing in size and it was believed that it was supporting local dissidents, including the socialist newspaper The Voice. As early as July 1980, the Libyans had been accused of providing military training to Gambians who had been recruited by Senegalese rebel leader, Sheikh Ahmed Niasse of Kaolack. On 29 October 1980, the Libyan embassy was shut down and diplomatic relations were broken off.

The background for the rebels involved in the attempted coup came from the Gambia Socialist Revolutionary Party (GSRP), founded in early 1980 by Gibril L. George, a former businessman. This party was joined by Kukoi Sanyang, a former National Convention Party politician who had traveled to Libya and the Soviet Union. After being declared unlawful on 30 October 1980, the party became the Gambia Underground Socialist Revolutionary Workers Party (GUSRWP), and committed itself to overthrow of the Gambian government. Supposed members of the GUSRWP who swore to overthrow the Gambian government included 10 civilians and 36 Field Force officers.

The ideology of the group was a "woolly and vulgarized form" of Marxist and radical pan-Africanist thinking. They spoke of "Victory for the Gambian revolutionary struggle under the dictatorship of the proletariat and the leadership of a Marxist-Leninist party" and of "Death to neocolonialism, racism and fascism."

Timeline

Build-up to the coup attempt 
Covert meetings in Serekunda were held in late July, led by Kukoi Sanyang, to plan the coup. Of the 15 members of this group, at least five had been involved in the Field Force. A number were also employed as taxi drivers - lending the name 'taxi driver's coup'. The plotters waited until President Dawda Jawara was out of the country to attend the wedding of Prince Charles and Lady Diana Spencer in London before launching the coup d'état.

Coup attempt 
In the early hours of the day, the coup began. Kukoi Sanyang and 10 accomplices made their way on foot to the Bakau Field Force Depot from Serekunda, five miles away. They broke into the depot using wire cutters and met up with a conspirator in the Field Force - Momodou Sonko - who let them into the armoury. Armed with Kalashnikov assault rifles, the group were able to take the Depot and collected Ousman Bojang, the former Assistant Commander. A number of disaffected Field Force officers also joined them, but the greater number fled. Once the Depot was taken, the rebels moved onto other targets of importance. By dawn, they had secured the Radio Gambia buildings, Yundum airport, and the State House in Banjul. Civilian supporters of the group were given weapons at the armoury in order to assist the coup.

References 

1981 in the Gambia
1980s coups d'état and coup attempts
Conflicts in 1981
Politics of the Gambia
Military history of the Gambia